Thooku Medai is a 1982 Indian Tamil-language drama film directed by Amirtham and written by M. Karunanidhi. The film stars Chandrasekhar and Menaka. It is an adaptation of Karunanidhi's play of the same name. The film was released on 28 May 1982.

Plot

Cast 

Chandrasekhar
Chakravarthy
Menaka
Usha Rajender
Nagesh

Production 
Thooku Medai is a film adaptation of the stage play of the same name written by M. Karunanidhi who scripted the film version too.

Soundtrack 
The music was composed by Shankar–Ganesh.

Controversy 
Karunanidhi was displeased with the censor board for reducing 500 feet of the film which contained his dialogues that "focussed on the long search from Madurai to Tiruchendur".

Release and reception 
Thooku Medai was released on 28 May 1982. The reviewer from Kalki lauded Chandrasekhar's performance, and his recital of Karunanidhi's dialogues. Despite this, it failed commercially.

References

External links 
 

1980s Tamil-language films
1982 drama films
1982 films
Films scored by Shankar–Ganesh
Films with screenplays by M. Karunanidhi
Indian drama films
Indian films based on plays